Dimitri Claeys (born June 18, 1987 in Sint-Amandsberg) is a Belgian cyclist, who currently rides for UCI WorldTeam . In June 2017, he was named in the startlist for the Tour de France.

Major results

2007
 1st Stage 5 (TTT) Volta a Lleida
 5th Overall Giro delle Regioni
 8th Liège–Bastogne–Liège U23
2008
 1st  Road race, National Under-23 Road Championships
 7th Grand Prix des Marbriers
2009
 1st  Road race, National Under-23 Road Championships
 9th Flèche Ardennaise
2010
 3rd Grand Prix des Marbriers
 7th Ronde Pévéloise
 9th Overall Szlakiem Grodów Piastowskich
 9th Overall Okolo Slovenska
2012
 3rd Omloop Het Nieuwsblad U23
 6th Circuit de Wallonie
 8th Zellik–Galmaarden
2013
 1st Omloop Het Nieuwsblad U23
 3rd Flèche Ardennaise
2014
 1st Dwars door de Vlaamse Ardennen
 1st Omloop Het Nieuwsblad U23
 2nd Circuit de Wallonie
2015
 1st  Overall Tour de Normandie
1st  Points classification
1st Stage 2
 1st Internationale Wielertrofee Jong Maar Moedig
 1st Grand Prix de la ville de Pérenchies
 1st Stage 4 Tour of Croatia
 2nd Grand Prix Impanis-Van Petegem
 2nd Ster van Zwolle
 2nd Ronde van Limburg
 2nd Dwars door de Vlaamse Ardennen
 2nd Grote Prijs Jef Scherens
 2nd Omloop Het Nieuwsblad U23
 2nd Duo Normand (with Olivier Pardini)
 4th Overall Paris–Arras Tour
1st Stage 1 (TTT)
 4th Kattekoers
 5th Circuit de Wallonie
 7th Overall Circuit des Ardennes
 7th Flèche Ardennaise
2016
 1st Grote Prijs Jef Scherens
 1st Stage 3 Tour de Wallonie
 2nd Internationale Wielertrofee Jong Maar Moedig
 4th Grand Prix La Marseillaise
 4th Druivenkoers Overijse
 6th Halle–Ingooigem
 8th Tro-Bro Léon
 9th Tour of Flanders
 9th Polynormande
 10th Grand Prix Pino Cerami
2017
 5th Dwars door het Hageland
 5th Tacx Pro Classic
 7th Polynormande
2018
 1st  Overall Four Days of Dunkirk
 2nd Grand Prix de Wallonie
 5th Tacx Pro Classic
 10th Grand Prix La Marseillaise
2019
 1st Famenne Ardenne Classic
 8th Overall Four Days of Dunkirk
 9th Polynormande
2020
 6th Tour of Flanders
2021
 8th Le Samyn
 10th Grand Prix de Wallonie

Grand Tour general classification results timeline

References

External links

1987 births
Living people
Belgian male cyclists
Sportspeople from Ghent
Cyclists from East Flanders
21st-century Belgian people